Gatka is a form of martial art associated primarily with the Sikhs of the Punjab and other related ethnic groups, such as Hindkowans. It is a style of stick-fighting, with wooden sticks intended to simulate swords. The Punjabi name, refers to the wooden stick used and this term might have originated as a diminutive of a Sanskrit word, meaning "mace".

It comes with a fitted leather hilt,  and is often decorated with Punjabi-style multi-coloured threads.

It is filled with either cotton or dry grass to protect the hand of player in case of full contact hit by an opponent.

Gatka originated in the Punjab in the 15th century. There has been a revival during the later 20th century, with an International Gatka Federation was founded in 1982 and formalized in 1987, and gatka is now popular as a sport or sword dance performance art and is often shown during Sikh festivals.

History

Gatka's theory and techniques were taught by the Sikh gurus. It has been handed down in an unbroken lineage of ustāds (masters), and taught in many akharas (arenas) around the world. Gatka was employed in the Sikh wars and has been thoroughly battle tested. It originates from the need to defend  (righteousness), but is also based on the unification of the spirit and body: miri piri). It is, therefore, generally considered to be both a spiritual and physical practice.

After the Second Anglo-Sikh War the art was banned by the new British administrators of India in the mid-19th century. During the Indian Rebellion of 1857, the Sikhs assisted the British in crushing the mutiny. As a consequence of this assistance, restrictions on fighting practices were relaxed, but the Punjabi martial arts which re-emerged after 1857 had changed significantly. The new style applied the sword-fighting techniques to the wooden training-stick. Gatka was used mainly by the British Indian Army in the 1860s as practice for hand-to-hand combat. This is a national sports event in India.

Competition
 (meaning "sport" or "game") is the modern competitive aspect of gatka, originally used as a method of sword-training or stick-fighting in medieval times. While  gatka is today most commonly associated with Sikhs, it has always been used in the martial arts of other ethno-cultural groups. It is still practiced in India and Pakistan by the Tanoli and Gujjar communities.

Influence on Defendu

The Defendu system devised by Captain William E. Fairbairn and Captain Eric Anthony Sykes borrowed methodologies from Gatka, jujutsu, Chinese martial arts and "gutter fighting". This method was used to train soldiers in close-combat techniques at the Commando Basic Training Centre at Achnacarry in Scotland.

See also

 Angampora
 Banshay
 Bataireacht
 Bōjutsu
 Commandos (United Kingdom)
 Hola Mohalla
 Indian martial arts
 Jūkendō
 Kalaripayattu
 Kendo
 Kenjutsu
 Krabi–krabong
 Kuttu Varisai
 Mardani khel
 Nihang
 Paika akhada
 Pehlwani
 Shastar Vidya
 Silambam
 Silambam Asia
 Special Operations Executive (SOE)
 Sqay
 Tahtib
 Thang-ta
 Varma kalai
 World Silambam Association

References

External links
 Nanak Dev Singh Khalsa & Sat Katar Kaur Ocasio-Khalsa (1991) Gatka as taught by Nanak Dev Singh, Book One - Dance of the Sword (2nd Edition). GT International, Phoenix, Arizona. 
 
 Olaf Janson (2015) Fairbairn–Sykes fighting knife: The famous fighting knife used by British commandos and SOE during WW2. Gothia Arms Historical Society

Indian martial arts
Pakistani martial arts
Combat sports
Rajput culture
Punjabi culture
Punjabi words and phrases
Nihang